Seguin High School may refer to:

Seguin High School (Arlington, Texas), named after Juan Seguín
Seguin High School, Seguin Independent School District, in Seguin, Texas